Adriane Kelemen Galisteu Iódice (born April 18, 1973) is a Brazilian actress, TV host and former model.

Biography 
Galisteu was born in the city of São Paulo, daughter of Alberto Galisteu and Emma Kelemen, and lived until she was 18 years old in Lapa, a neighborhood in São Paulo. Her father's grandparents, José Galisteo and Maria Muñoz, were Spanish and arrived in Brazil in 1899 on the vessel "Les Alpes", coming from Málaga, Andalusia. Her mother is of Hungarian descent.

Galisteu had a difficult childhood due to her father Alberto's alcoholism. His health was affected, and he suffered a heart attack and died in 1989. Adriane, aged fifteen at the time, began working to support her family.

Career
Galisteu has appeared in the Brazilian edition of Playboy magazine on a number of occasions and was a VJ for MTV Brasil.

Personal life
She was the girlfriend of Formula One driver Ayrton Senna at the time of his death in a racing accident in the 1994 San Marino Grand Prix.

In 2009, Galisteu married Alexandre Iódice, fashion businessman and heir to the fashion house founded by his father, Valdemar Iódice. They are the parents of son Vittorio Iódice, born on August 4, 2010 in São Paulo.

Filmography

Television

Film

Internet

Theater

References

External links

 

1973 births
Living people
Actresses from São Paulo
Brazilian people of Spanish descent
Brazilian people of Hungarian descent
Brazilian television actresses
Brazilian female models
Brazilian television presenters
Brazilian women television presenters
Racing drivers' wives and girlfriends
Association footballers' wives and girlfriends